"Every Chance I Get" is a song by American record producer DJ Khaled featuring American rappers Lil Baby and Lil Durk. It was sent to rhythmic contemporary radio as the third single off the former's twelfth studio album, Khaled Khaled, on May 11, 2021. The song received mostly positive responses from critics, with some deeming it a highlight off the album. Lyrically, it sees the rappers boasting about their successes.

Background and composition
According to Khaled, Durk sent his verse back the same day Khaled sent him the track. Although Baby and Durk had been teasing a collaborative album, which would later be revealed to be titled The Voice of the Heroes and released on June 4, 2021, Khaled said that he had "Every Chance I Get" long before the duo were planning on working together. The song is one of three tracks off Khaled Khaled to feature Lil Baby, along with "I Did It" and "Body in Motion". Baby also appeared on Khaled's 2019's album Father of Asahd, on the track "You Stay".

A trap-infused song, it sees the rappers delivering fast-paced flows and braggadocious lyrics, trading verses about "stunting" on their enemies, street life, women, and wealth. Baby performs the first and second verse as well as the chorus, while Durk does the third and final verse.

Critical reception
In their album review, Rolling Stones Jeff Ihaza named the song one of the "shining moments" on the album, praising Baby and Durk's "explosive bars", and said they "are operating at a new peak". Clashs Robin Murray agreed, calling it a "real golden moment" on Khaled Khaled. NMEs Luke Morgan Britton singled out Lil Baby for delivering a "standout" feature, stating that it shows "why he's one of the most effortless rappers right now". Stereogums Chris DeVille ranked the song as the second-best on the album, stating: "Sometimes it's as easy as throwing two of the most reliably compelling sing-rap stars in the game over a thundering Tay Keith production". Mitch Findlay of HotNewHipHop called the song a highlight off the album, writing: "Though it should no longer be expected to see a rapper bringing their A-game to a DJ Khaled project (the days of 'We Takin Over' are, alas, over), Lil Baby and Durk bring the passion that has come to be associated with their brand". Complexs Eric Skelton said the song is a good preview of Baby and Durk's collaborative album: "Pulling off the best rap collaboration on the whole album, their chemistry is undeniable as Durk punctuates the end of each of Baby's verses by singing, 'Yeah, yeah, yeah, yeah, yeah'. Conversely, Varietys A.D Amorosi called the song turgid and said it "goes nowhere".

Accolades

Music video
The song's official video was released on May 4, 2021, directed by Joseph Kahn. Set in a fiery 
CGI backdrop, it features an array of expensive cars and video vixens. As Lamborghinis start burning and lightning strikes, the artists turn the chaos into a party. Mike Winslow of AllHipHop noted the video "emphasizes gritty cinematic scenes with pyrotechnics in an urban environment".

Charts

Weekly charts

Year-end charts

Certifications

Release history

References

2021 songs
2021 singles
DJ Khaled songs
Lil Baby songs
Lil Durk songs
Songs written by DJ Khaled
Songs written by Lil Durk
Songs written by Lil Baby
Songs written by Tay Keith
Song recordings produced by Tay Keith
Music videos directed by Joseph Kahn
Epic Records singles